"My Song" is the 1952 debut single by Johnny Ace. Backed by The Beale Streeters, "My Song" was the first of three number one's on the US Billboard R&B chart for Johnny Ace.

Aretha Franklin version
Aretha Franklin released a version of the song that reached number 10 on the U.S. R&B chart and number 31 on the Billboard Hot 100 in 1968.

Chart performance

Johnny Ace

Aretha Franklin

References

1952 songs
1952 debut singles
1968 singles
Johnny Ace songs
Aretha Franklin songs
Duke Records singles
Atlantic Records singles